Stephen Waddams is a Canadian legal scholar. He has taught at the University of Toronto Faculty of Law since 1968.

Education 
Waddams earned a Bachelor of Arts degree from the University of Toronto and Bachelor of Laws from the University of Toronto Faculty of Law . As a law student, he was editor-in-chief of the University of Toronto Faculty of Law Review in 1968. Waddams earned a Master of Arts and PhD from the University of Cambridge, followed by a Master of Laws and Doctor of Juridical Science from the University of Michigan Law School.

Career 
Waddams' specialty is contract law and he has published seven books on it and other private law topics. He was elected a fellow of the Royal Society of Canada in 1988. From 1988-1989, he was a visiting fellow at All Souls College, Oxford.

Books
 Products Liability (Carswell, Toronto, 1974; subsequent editions in 1980, 1993, and 2002).
 The Law of Contracts (Canada Law Book, Toronto, 1977; subsequent editions in 1984, 1993, 1999, and 2005).
 Introduction to the Study of Law (Carswell, Toronto, 1979; subsequent editions in 1983, 1987, 1992, 1997, and 2004).
 The Law of Damages (Canada Law Book, Toronto, 1983; subsequent editions in 1991, 1997, and 2004).
 Law, Politics, and the Church of England: the career of Stephen Lushington, 1782 - 1873 (Cambridge University Press, 1992).
 Sexual Slander in Nineteenth-Century England: Defamation in the Ecclesiastical Courts, 1815–1855 (University of Toronto Press, 2000).
 Dimensions of Private Law: Categories and Concepts in Anglo-American Reasoning (Cambridge University Press, 2003).
 Principles and Policy in Contract Law: Competing or Complementary Perspectives? (Cambridge University Press, 2011).
 Sanctity of Contracts in a Secular Age: Equity, Fairness and Enrichment (Cambridge University Press, 2019).

References

External links
 University of Toronto bio
 SSRN profile

Canadian legal scholars
Fellows of All Souls College, Oxford
Fellows of the Royal Society of Canada
University of Michigan alumni
University of Toronto alumni
Academic staff of the University of Toronto
Academic staff of the University of Toronto Faculty of Law
University of Toronto Faculty of Law alumni
Living people
Legal scholars of the University of Oxford
Year of birth missing (living people)
Alumni of the University of Cambridge